The Conservative Christian Party of the Belarusian People's Front is a political party in Belarus that opposes the government of president Alexander Lukashenko. It was de facto formed after the split of the Belarusian People's Front in 1999.

The October 2004 legislative elections were boycotted by the party, led by Zianon Pazniak. These elections fell according to the OSCE/ODIHR Election Observation Mission  significantly short of OSCE commitments. Universal principles and constitutionally guaranteed rights of expression, association and assembly were seriously challenged, calling into question the Belarusian authorities' willingness to respect the concept of political competition on a basis of equal treatment. Principles of an inclusive democratic process—whereby citizens have the right to seek political office without discrimination, candidates can present their views without obstruction, and voters can learn the views and discuss them freely—were largely ignored.

The Conservative Christian Party refused to join the oppositional coalition led by Alaksandar Milinkievič in 2006, as CCP cited the inability to ensure ethical behaviour in Lukashenko's administration, in the voting process, and the calculation of votes. The election ended cycle ended with voting falsifications and was not acknowledged by either the EU or the United States.

The party opposes the Russian language having the status of an official language in Belarus, which is a status it was given in the 1995 Belarusian referendum.

The party has boycotted all the parliamentary elections (2000, 2004, 2008, 2012, 2016) since the establishment of the authoritarian regime of President Lukashenko.

An interesting fact is that the Party's website does not have any feedback from the party at all. There is no information on the party's website on how a citizen can join a party, or at least write a letter to the party. The website of the party does not contain any links to social networks. There is no information on the party's e-mail on the party's website.

References

External links
 

1999 establishments in Belarus
Belarusian nationalism
Christianity in Belarus
Conservative parties in Belarus
Eastern Orthodox political parties
Political parties established in 1999
Political parties in Belarus
Right-wing parties in Europe
Right-wing politics in Belarus
National conservative parties
Social conservative parties